Francisco Peláez Vega (December 2, 1911 - December 30, 1977), known by his pen name Francisco Tario, was a Mexican writer. Tario became a cult writer known for his surrealistic, grotesque and fantastic literature. His work has been compared by critics to the work of Juan José Arreola, Juan Rulfo, and Emil Cioran.

Life and career

Life
Tario was born Francisco Peláez Vega on December 2, 1911, in Mexico City, the son of immigrants from Asturias. Tario's father was a grocery store owner. His brother was the painter Antonio Peláez. 

In 1930, Tario met Carmen Farell and married her in 1935. The couple had two sons, Sergio and Julio.

Besides being a writer, Tario had multiple interests throughout his life: he was a football goalkeeper for the Mexican team Asturias F.C., amateur astronomer, and pianist. He also owned three movie theaters in Acapulco.

Career
Tario is generally considered a marginal author because he did not form part of any literary movement or join any literary group.  He was unknown for many years. He wrote short stories, novels and plays. He has been compared to Juan Rulfo for the personal world he invented for his writings, as well as for the characteristics of his characters, who nevertheless have their own originality. His themes encompass man's sensory limitations in perceiving the vastness of the world around him, but without losing sight of the sense of humour, the appearance of the unusual, the extravagant and the grotesque, which distance him from the traditionalism of other authors, which is why he is considered a precursor of Mexican fantastic narrative in the 1950s.

His novel  (1993; English: "Secret Garden") and the play  (1968; English: "The Killed Horse") were published posthumously.

In 2011 his son Julio, with the help of the Instituto Nacional de Bellas Artes, distributed free of charge  (English: "Two Black Gloves"), a booklet containing a poem and two stories dedicated to his sons Sergio and Julio; the texts were found in a baroque and colonial-style chest of drawers belonging to Tario, where he kept some photographic albums, newspaper clippings, recordings and from where the play  and the novel  were also found.

Works

Short story collections
 La noche (1943)
 Tapioca Inn (1952) 
 Una violeta de más (1968)

Novels
 Aquí abajo (1943) 
 Jardín secreto (1993; posthumous)

Plays
 El caballo asesinado y otras piezas teatrales (1988; posthumous)

Anthologies
 La noche del féretro y otros cuentos de la noche (1958)

Miscellaneous writings 
 Equinoccio (1946) 
 La puerta en el muro (1946) 
 Yo de amores qué sabía (1950) 
 Breve diario de un amor perdido (1951)
 Acapulco en el sueño. Con fotografías de Lola Álvarez Bravo (1951)

See also
 Grotesque literature
 Juan Rulfo
 Juan José Arreola

References

Mexican writers
Mexican male short story writers
Mexican short story writers
Mexican novelists
Writers from Mexico City
1911 births
1977 deaths